If Only or Blessed ( Yerani) is an Armenian romantic melodrama television series. The series premiered on Kentron TV on January 6, 2016.
The series takes place in Yerevan, Armenia.

Cast and characters
 Ben Avetisyan as Aram
 Shushanna Tovmasyan as Ani
 Sofi Devoyan as Sophie
 Eteri Voskanyan as Lilith
 Adriana Galstyan as Martha
 Garik Chepchyan
 Gohar Igityan
 Alina Martirosyan
 Harutyun Movsisyan
Vruyr Harutyunyan
Irina Ayvazyan as Lisa

External links

 
 Watch Yerani online
 Смотреть все серии Ерани
 Yerani on Kentron TV
 Yerani at the Internet Movie Database

Armenian drama television series
Armenian-language television shows
2010s teen drama television series
2016 Armenian television series debuts
2010s Armenian television series
Kentron TV original programming